Steven Le Coquen is a Grand Prix motorcycle racer from France. He competes in the Endurance World Cup aboard a Yamaha YZF-R1.

Career statistics

By season

Races by year

References

External links
 Profile on motogp.com

1991 births
Living people
French motorcycle racers
125cc World Championship riders